Agonochaetia incredibilis is a moth of the family Gelechiidae. It is found in Uzbekistan.

References

Moths described in 1965
Agonochaetia
Moths of Asia